Ileana Citaristi is an Italian Odissi and Chhau dancer, and dance instructor based in Bhubaneswar, India. She was awarded the 43rd National Film Awards for Best Choreography for Yugant in 1995 and became, in 2006, the first dancer of foreign origin to be conferred the Padma Shri for her contributions to Odissi.

Early life
Citaristi, a native of Bergamo, Italy, the daughter of Severino Citaristi, a leading politician of the Democrazia Cristiana party of Italy. She spent five years as an actress in traditional and experimental theatre in Italy before deciding to learn Kathakali.

She went to Kerala, where she spent three rigorous months studying Kathakali before she went to Odisha on the advice of her Kathakali guru, Krishnan Namboodari.

Since 1979, she has been living in Odisha. She holds a Doctorate of Philosophy with a thesis on 'Psychoanalysis and Eastern Mythology'.

Dancing career 

Citaristi studied Odissi under Guru Kelucharan Mohapatra and started her own school of dance in 1994. Citaristi is also an exponent of the Mayurbhanj Chhau, which she learnt under the tutelage of Guru Hari Nayak and holds the title of an acharya of Chhau from the Sangeet Mahavidyalya of Bhubaneswar. She founded the Art Vision Academy in 1996, which acts as a platform for sharing ideas between various artistic forms such as theatre, music, dance and painting. The Academi also conducts classes in Odissi and Chhau.

She has presented her solo dance recitals as well as her creative group choreographies  in all the major festivals in India and travelled in many foreign countries such as Italy, Argentina, Poland, France, Germany. Holland, Denmark, Malaysia, Hong Kong, Japan,   USA, Australia , Israel, Spain , Poland., South Korea,  Canada, Peru and Portugal.

Major  dance performances abroad 
- International Meeting of Moving Theatre, Budapest

- International Tanz-Werkstat, Bonn

- International Tanzprojekt, Munster

- Latin American Theatre Festival, Cordoba, Argentina

- Mandapa, Paris

- Vignale Danza, Italy

- Estate Fiesolana, Italy

- International Festival of Dance, Hong Kong

- Soeterjin, Amsterdam

- Todi festival, Italy

- J.A.D.E. 93, Tokyo

- Congress on Dance Research, Corfù

- Festival La Versiliana, Italy

- Invito alla Danza, Italy

- Festival of Performing Arts, Cleveland

- PanditJasraj School of Music, Vancouver

- Aid Australia, Sidney

- Teatro Olimpico, Rome

- Sommer Morchen, Kuala Lumpur

- Roots in Transit, Hostelbro, Denmark

- Stage centre Workshop, Tel Aviv

- XIII  session I:S:T:A:, (International School of Theatre Anthropology) Seville, Spain

- XIV  session I:S:T:A: Wroclaw, Poland

- Seoul Institute of Performing Arts, South Korea

- Kalanidhi International Dance Conference, Toronto

- Alain Danielou Centenary Celebrations, Rome

- I have a dream production, Teatro Massimo, Palermo

- The Bad Boys of Piano, Teatro Nazionale, Rome

- Nehru Centre, London

- Indian Cultural Centre, Berlin

- India @70 celebration of 70years of India Independence, Lisbona, Portugal

Major productions 
Ileana Citaristi is noted for her innovative choreographic productions in Odissi and Chhau that bring together themes and styles from both the West and the East. In Chhau, some of her notable productions are ‘Echo and Narcissus' based on the Greek myth in Ovid's Metamorphoses, ‘The Journey' that draws on Japanese haiku, ‘Images of Change' based on the Chinese concept of Yin and Yang and ‘Still I Rise' based on Maya Angelou's eponymous poem. In Odissi, 'Maya Darpan', 'Mahanadi: and the river flows', about the history and cultural geography of Orissa, 'Karuna', based on the life of Mother Teresa and Sharanam, a piece on women from three faiths who attain salvation despite their dubious pasts, are some of her notable compositions.

- Echo and Narcissus, (solo), Bombay, 1985

- The wreck, (solo), New Delhi, 1988

- Icarus, (group), New Delhi, 1991

- Maya Darpana, (group), Bombay 1993

- Pancha Bhuta, (group), Baripada, 1996

- The Journey, (solo) New Delhi, 1998

- Images of Change, (duet), Bombay, 2000

- Surya Devata, (group), Konarak, 2001

- Jarjara, (group), Bhubaneswar, 2003

- Still I rise, (solo), Bhubaneswar, 2005

- Tantra (duet), Bhubaneswar, 2006

- Exploration (duet), Bhubaneswar, 2006

- Karpasa (group), Hyderabad, 2006

- Ekadasa Rudra , Doordarshan (2006)

- Saraha (group), New Delhi 2006

- Bolero (group), Bhubaneswar, 2007

- Rhydhum, (duet), Bhubaneswar, 2007

- I have a dream, (group) Palermo, 2008

- Sparsh, Bhubneswar, (duet)2008

- Mahanadi…and the river flows, (group) Bhubaneswar, 2008

-Partha Sarathi (duet), Bhubaneswar 2009

-Karuna (group) Bhubaneswar 2010

-Maana Bhanjan (group) Bhubaneswar 2011

-Kaala-Timebound (group) Bhubaneswar 2012

-Siddhartha (group) Bhubaneswar 2014

- Akshara (group)  Bhubaneswar  2016

-Refugee (group) Bhubaneswar 2018

-Meghadootham (group) 2019

Books and films 
Besides Yugantar, a Bengali film directed by Aparna Sen for which she won a National Film Award in 1996, Citaristi has also choreographed for M.F. Hussain's Meenaxi: A Tale of Three Cities (2004)  and Goutam Ghose's Abar Aranye (2003).
Citaristi is also the author of three books. In 2001, she published The Making of a Guru: Kelucharan Mohapatra, his Life and Times in 2012 the Traditional Martial Practices in Orissa and in 2016 My Journey, a  Tale of Two Births.

Awards and honours 
Citaristi is a ´Top´ grade artist of Doordarshan. She was conferred the title of ´Leonide Massine for the art of dance' in 1992. In 1996, she won the National Film Award for Best Choreography for her work in Aparna Sen's Bengali film Yugant (1995). She is empanelled as ‘outstanding artist’ in ICCR.

She is also a recipient of the ´Raseshwar Award' given by the Sur Singar Sansad, Mumbai. For her contributions to Odissi, she was conferred the Padma Shri by Government of India in 2006. The Italian government made her a member of the Order of the Star of Italian Solidarity in 2008.

- Leonide Massine for the Art of Dance, Italy, 1992

- Rasehswar, Bombay, 1994

- Cine Critic Association Award, Calcutta, 1995

- National Award for Best Choreography for film Yugant, New Delhi, 1996

- Prananath Patnaik Award, Bhubaneswar, 2005

- Padmashree award, New Delhi, 2006

- Sanskiti Siromani, Mumbai, 2006

- Desharatna by Bharati Foundation Trust, Bhubaneswar (2007)

- Lalithakala award by Sri Lalithakala Academy Foundation, Mysore, 2007

- Pandit Jasraj Award for Cross Cultural Understanding, from Rotary Club, Hyderabad, 2009

- Order of Star of Italian Solidatiety (OSSI), from President of Italy, New Delhi 2008

-Odisha Women Leadership award from Odisha Yuve Sanskrutik Sansad, Bhubaneswar, 2012

-Showcase Odisha from Prelude, Bhubaneswar, 2014

-Nalco Karavela Award from Nalco, Bhubaneswar, 2016

-Bhavan Samman by Bharatiya Vidya Bhavan, Bhubaneswar, 2018

-Mutthiral Pathistha Vithakar by Karur Natyanjali Trust, Karur (Tamil Nadu) 2018

-Suresh Balabantaray Samman, Bhubaneswar 2018

-Saptashajya samman by  Devanshi Dance Academi, Dhenkanal (Odisha) 2018

- Odisha Excellence (Dance) by Odia Media, Bhubaneswar 2019.

Works
 The Making of a Guru: Kelucharan Mohapatra, His Life and Times, Published by Manohar Pub., 2001. .
Traditional Martial Practices in Odisha, Subhi Publications, New Delhi, 2012
My Journey, a Tale of Two Births, Manohar Publication , New Delhi, 2016

References

External links
 Ileana Citaristi's Website
Maana Bhanjan

Living people
Odissi exponents
People from Bergamo
Artists from Bhubaneswar
Dancers from Odisha
Women artists from Odisha
Women educators from Odisha
Chhau exponents
Italian female dancers
Italian stage actresses
Italian emigrants to India
Teachers of Indian classical dance
Performers of Indian classical dance
Italian choreographers
Italian expatriates in India
Recipients of the Padma Shri in arts
Year of birth missing (living people)
Best Choreography National Film Award winners
20th-century Italian dancers
20th-century Italian women artists
20th-century Italian educators
20th-century women educators
21st-century Italian dancers
21st-century Italian women artists
21st-century Italian educators
21st-century women educators